Merrick may refer to:

Places
 Merrick Mountains, Palmer Land, Antarctica
 Merrick Glacier, Oates Land, Antarctica
 Merrick Point, Marie Byrd Land, Antarctica
 Merrick (Galloway), a mountain in southern Scotland
 Merrick, New York, a hamlet and census-designated place
 Merrick, West Springfield, a neighborhood in western Massachusetts
 Merrick County, Nebraska
 Merrick State Park, Wisconsin
 65672 Merrick, an asteroid

People
 Merrick (surname)
 Merrick (given name)
 Chris Hughes (musician) (born 1954), also known as Merrick, British record producer and musician

Arts and entertainment
 Merrick Mayfair, a character in The Vampire Chronicles series by Anne Rice
 Merrick (novel), by Anne Rice
 Merrick Baliton, one of the Wild Force Power Rangers in the Power Rangers universe
 Merrick, Buffy's mentor in the 1992 film Buffy the Vampire Slayer
 Antoc Merrick, a Rebel pilot and general in the film Rogue One: A Star Wars Story
 Bob Merrick, the male lead character in the 1954 film Magnificent Obsession, played by Rock Hudson
 Jackie Merrick, a minor character in the British soap opera Emmerdale Farm
 Trish Merrick, a character in the TV series Jericho

Other uses
 Merrick Road, known as Merrick Boulevard in New York City
 Merrick station, a Long Island Rail Road station in Merrick, New York
 Merrick Art Gallery, an early private art museum in western Pennsylvania, on the National Register of Historic Places
 USS Merrick (AKA-97), a US Navy attack cargo ship

See also
 Merrick Butte, Monument Valley, Arizona
 Merricks, Victoria, a town in Australia
 Meyrick, a surname and given name
 Meyrick baronets, a title in the Baronetage of the United Kingdom
 Tal Merrik, a senator in the animated TV series Star Wars: The Clone Wars
 Meyrick family, later spelled Merrick
 Marek's disease